Robert Dillon, 3rd Baron Clonbrock (29 March 1807 – 4 December 1893), was an Irish peer.

Dillon was the son of Luke Dillon, 2nd Baron Clonbrock, by the Honourable Anastasia, daughter of Joseph Blake, 1st Baron Wallscourt. He was educated at Eton and Christ Church, Oxford. In December 1826, aged 19, he succeeded his father in the barony. This was an Irish peerage and did not entitle him to an automatic seat in the House of Lords. However, in 1838 he was elected an Irish Representative Peer. In 1872 he was appointed Lord-Lieutenant of Galway, a post he held until 1892.

Family
Lord Clonbrock married the Honourable Caroline Elizabeth, daughter of Francis Spencer, 1st Baron Churchill, in 1830. They had four sons and eight daughters :

 Hon Luke Amalric Dillon (b. 5 July 1832 - dvp Feb 1833)
 Hon Luke Dillon, 4th Baron Clonbrock (10 March 1834 – 12 May 1917)
 Col Hon Robert Villiers Dillon (b. 10 Dec 1838 - 19 April 1923), mar. 3 June 1873 Harriet Caroline Elizabeth Gladstone (d. 25 Feb 1932), dau of A S Gladstone
 Hon Francis William Dillon (b. 20 Dec 1842 - dvp 9 April 1858)
 Hon Frances Letita Dillon (d. 26 September 1911)
 Hon Caroline Anastasia Dillon (d. 15 Apr 1907), mar 30 Jan 1877 William Dealtry CMG, son of Ven...
 Hon Helen Isabella Dillon (d. 8 Nov 1916)
 Hon Louisa Emilia Dillon (d. 23 May 1927)
 Hon Georgiana Louisa Dillon (dvp. 2 May 1892)
 Hon Alice Elizabeth Dillon (dvp 18 Dec 1878) mar. 26 July 1866 married John Congreve in 1866 and settled at Mount Congreve estate.
 Hon Katherine Charlotte Dillon (d. 14 August 1927)
 Hon Elizabeth Octavia Dillon (d. 12 January 1928), mar 13 Jan 1875 Hugh Ellis-Nanney

Lady Clonbrock died at Clonbrock in December 1864, aged 59. Lord Clonbrock remained a widower until his death in December 1893, aged 86. He was succeeded in the barony by his second but eldest surviving son.

Cricket
Dillon was a member of Marylebone Cricket Club (MCC) and appeared in five first-class cricket matches between 1832 and 1834. He was recorded on scorecards as "Lord Clonbrock", scored a cumulative 13 runs and had a highest score of 6.

References

1807 births
1893 deaths
Barons in the Peerage of Ireland
Irish representative peers
People educated at Eton College
People from County Galway
Alumni of Christ Church, Oxford
Lord-Lieutenants of Galway
Irish cricketers
English cricketers
Marylebone Cricket Club cricketers
Gentlemen cricketers
19th-century Irish people
English cricketers of 1826 to 1863
Non-international England cricketers